Serhiy Osovych (born 16 December 1973 in Ivano-Frankivsk) is an Austrian sprinter of Ukrainian origin, who specialized in the 200 metres. Before 2003 he competed for Ukraine.

At the 1994 European Championships in Helsinki Osovych finished fourth in the 200 m race and won a silver medal in 4 × 100 m relay. At the 1998 European Indoor Athletics Championships in Valencia he won a gold medal in 200 m.

Personal bests

External links

1973 births
Living people
Sportspeople from Ivano-Frankivsk
Austrian male sprinters
Ukrainian male sprinters
Athletes (track and field) at the 1996 Summer Olympics
Olympic athletes of Ukraine
European Athletics Championships medalists